Ozyorny is a rural locality (a settlement) in Unechsky District, Bryansk Oblast, Russia. The population was 4 as of 2010. There is 1 street.

Geography 
Ozyorny is located 33 km east of Unecha (the district's administrative centre) by road. Rassukha is the nearest rural locality.

References 

Rural localities in Unechsky District